Perivale Park Athletics Track is an athletics track in Ealing, West London. It is the home of Ealing, Southall and Middlesex Athletics Club and the West London Hammer School.

External links
UK Running Track Directory entry

Sports venues in London
Sport in the London Borough of Ealing